Richard Gill may refer to:

Richard Gill (plant collector) (c. 1901–1958), known for work on traditional curare preparation methods
Richard T. Gill (1927–2010), opera singer and Harvard economics professor
Richard Gill (conductor) (1941–2018), Australian conductor
Richard D. Gill (born 1951), Anglo-Dutch mathematician / mathematical statistician
Richard J. Gill (1886–1959), lumberman and political figure in New Brunswick
Richard Gill, a character from the film Hackers